Lavanda is a rural settlement (Ukraine) in the Alushta Municipality of the Autonomous Republic of Crimea, a territory recognized by a majority of countries as part of Ukraine and annexed by Russia as the Republic of Crimea. The word literally means "lavender."

It is administratively subordinate to the Luchyste Village Council. Its population was 177 in the 2001 Ukrainian census. Current population: Population:  The M18 highway runs near the settlement.

References

Rural settlements in Crimea
Alushta Municipality